Galashians — historical Ingush ethnoterritorial society, which formed in the middle of 18th century. The name comes from the village of Galashki, which is geographically located in the very center of the society. Galashians were located in the middle and lower reaches of the river Assa and the basin of the river Fortanga.

History

Formation of the Society 
The Galashian society formed during the middle of 18th century when mountain Ingushes settled in the lowlands between Assa and Fortanga rivers. Orstkhoy, Tsorin, and Khamkhin (Ghalghaï) shahars played the greatest role in the formation of the Galashian society.

Caucasian War 
During the Caucasian War, the Galashians actively participated on the side of Imamate and were commonly referred as un-ruly or half-conquered by the Russian Empire, as they never really did bow under the Russian rule and continued on making raids on Russian royal fortifications and settlements. Vilayet Kalay which was known in the Russian Empire as Galashkinskoe Naibstvo was established in March 1840 on the territory of Galashian society with the center of it being the village of Galashki, when the Galashian and Karabulak (Orstkhoy) societies joined the uprising of Chechnya and with their deputies together with Chechens solemnly swore allegiance to Imam Shamil in the large center village of Lesser Chechnya, Urus-Martan. The Galashians were conquered in the end of Caucasian War after numerous punitive expeditions.

Chronology of major events:

 1830 — Punitive expediton of Abkhazov to mountainous Ingushetia, during which the Galashian society was also affected.
 1832 — Due to the collaboration of Ingush with Ghazi Muhammad and the murder of a bailiff, Rozen led a punitive expedition on Ingush and went through Dzheyrakh and Metskhal around Khamkhi and Tsori, during which the Galashian society was also affected.
 1840 — the Karabulak (Orstkhoy) and Galashian societies joined the uprising of Chechnya and with their deputies together with Chechens solemnly swore allegiance to Imam Shamil in the large center village of Lesser Chechnya, Urus-Martan. Thus Galashkinskoe Naibstvo was established.
 January of 1847 — Russian troops under the command of General Nesterov made a punitive expediton to Galashian Gorge.
 1858 — The Galashians together with the Nazranians took part in one of the episodes of the Great Caucasian War — the Nazran uprising, which ended unsuccessfully and the leaders of the uprising were either executed or exiled.
 After the end of the war — Galashians, alongside Akkins, Tsorins and Ghalghaï were forcibly evicted/resettled to lowlands and their lands were given to Cossacks.

Modern History 
After the Russian Revolution of 1917, when the Cossack stripes that divided the Ingush societies were mostly eliminated, the official significance of territorial societies weakened, and soon after the formation of the Ingush Autonomous Oblast, it completely disappeared.

See also 
 Galashkinskoe Naibstvo
 Ingush societies
 Nazranians
 Khamkhins
 Fyappiy
 Ingush diaspora

Notes

References

Bibliography 
 
 
 
 
 
 
 
 
 
 
 
 
 

History of Ingushetia
Ingush societies